Vasilios Kitsakis (born 24 January 2003) is a Greek professional footballer who plays as a right-back for Super League 2 club PAOK B.

References

2003 births
Living people
Greek footballers
Greece youth international footballers
Super League Greece 2 players
PAOK FC B players
Association football defenders
Footballers from Ioannina